Mária Bencsik (born 10 November 1939) is a Hungarian gymnast. She competed in six events at the 1960 Summer Olympics.

References

1939 births
Living people
Hungarian female artistic gymnasts
Olympic gymnasts of Hungary
Gymnasts at the 1960 Summer Olympics
Gymnasts from Budapest